Hilpas Sulin (born 7 September 1934 in Hämeenlinna, Finland) is a retired Finnish ice-hockey player and coach. He played 87 matches and scored 50 points for HPK between the years 1952-1960. He also coached HPK from 1968 to 1975, and again from 1978 to 1981.

References

External links
Sulin's profile in finnish ice-hockey museum's website (Finnish)

1934 births
Finnish ice hockey players
HPK players
Living people
People from Hämeenlinna
Sportspeople from Kanta-Häme